The Philippe Cousteau Anchor Museum is located in Salinas, a town within the Castrillón municipality of Asturias, Spain. It is reached by the N-632.

The open-air museum is situated on La Peñona peninsula at one end of the beach near the Arnao tunnel. It includes sales and deck anchors, along with a large, ceramic mural.  The featured bust of Philippe Cousteau is the work of sculptor Vicente Menendez-Santarúa Prendes.

One of the anchors is from the bulk carrier Castillo de Salas that ran aground over rocks near Gijon in 1986.

References

Asturian culture
Museums in Asturias
Open-air museums in Spain
Maritime museums in Spain